Xiyuan Township is a township-level division situated in the Longyan district of Zhangping City, Fujian, China.

See also
List of township-level divisions of Fujian

References

Township-level divisions of Fujian